The Bible Society of Nigeria (abbreviated BSN)  is a Christian non-governmental and not for profit organization in Nigeria that translates, publishes and distributes Bibles in English and  several local Nigerian languages . It was established on 8 February 1966, building on earlier work by the British and Foreign Bible Society, the American Bible Society, and the Scottish Bible Society, which translated and published the Bible in the Efik language in 1868. Pastor Samuel Adesola Sanusi 
is the current General Secretary and Chief Executive Officer of the Bible Society of Nigeria.

History
The Bible Society of Nigeria was founded on 8 February 1966 through the pioneering efforts of the late Dr. Francis Ezeogo Akanu Ibiam, the first indigenous Governor of the defunct Eastern Region. Earlier in February, 1965, Dr. Ibiam had initiated a consultation with representatives of most of the Churches [Church organizations] in Nigeria on the need to form a national Bible Society in Nigeria. It was the unanimous decision of that meeting that The Bible Society of Nigeria be formed which consequently led to its formation and inauguration on 8 February 1966.
Before 1966, The Society was under the supervision of the British and Foreign Bible Society [BFBS] which had operated in Nigeria as far back as 1807. Then the Bible House, Apapa was serving as a distribution centre to other neighbouring West African countries.

The Society Today
The society has it headquarters at Office Address 18, Wharf Road, Apapa, Lagos State, Nigeria.
Its corporate office is located at 150, Ikorodu Road, Onipanu, Lagos State, Nigeria.  It has Bible Distribution centres in other Nigerian cities: 
 ABUJA: 23, Ndola Crescent, Wuse Zone 5, Abuja.
 LAGOS II: 7, Boladale Street, Opposite Mr. Biggs Oshodi.
 ABA: The Bible Society of Nigeria, St. Michael’s Cathedral, St. Michael’s Road, Aba.
 JOS: The Bible Society of Nigeria, 53, Tafawa Balewa Road, Jos.
 IBADAN: Plot 7A, Trinity Avenue, Educational Estate Samonda, Ibadan.

Translation Projects
The organization has translated the Bible into 26 Nigerian Languages.

Among the twenty-six (26) different languages the Bible has been translated are: 
 Kalabari, 
 Okrika, 
 Isoko, 
 Igala, 
 Igede, 
 Ebira, 
 Yoruba,
 Efik, 
 Igbo, 
 Hausa, 
 Nupe,
 Khana, 
 Urhobo, 
 Fulfude,
 Bokyi, 
 Edo, 
 Tiv, 
 Itsekiri.

Guest Houses
The Bible Society of Nigeria has three guest houses located in three Nigerian cities (Lagos, Ibadan and Abuja).

References

External links

Charities based in Nigeria
Bible societies
Christian organizations established in 1966
Christian organizations established in the 20th century
1966 establishments in Nigeria